Dobo Port (Indonesian: Pelabuhan Dobo) is a small seaport located at Dobo, Aru Islands Regency, Maluku province of Indonesia. It is operated directly by regency government. Currently it has capacity of 750 GT.

References 

Ports and harbours of Indonesia